New River Community College (NRCC) is a public community college in Dublin, Virginia, in the New River Valley of southwestern Virginia. It is one of the 23 colleges in the Virginia Community College System. NRCC's service region covers the counties of Montgomery, Floyd, Pulaski and Giles and the city of Radford.

Campus 
The main campus, consisting of four buildings, is located on a 100-acre site in Dublin.  The college also maintains a satellite campus at the New River Valley Mall in Christiansburg.  NRCC campuses provide technical and vocational programs as well as university-parallel programs.

History
NRCC opened as New River Vocational-Technical School in 1959 and came under the jurisdiction of the VCCS in 1966. It was originally located in the City of Radford, in the old Belle Hethe Elementary School Building. The school's name was changed in late 1969. In November of that same year, the newly named New River Community College broke ground in Dublin. Currently, the college has an average enrollment of approximately 5,000 students.

The college’s current president is Dr. Patricia B. Huber, who has served in that capacity since 2017. She is the fifth president and first female to hold that position.

2013 shooting incident
On April 12, 2013, a gunman opened fire with a shotgun at a satellite campus at the New River Valley Mall in Christiansburg, Virginia. Two women were wounded. An off-duty security guard and two police officers subdued the gunman. The suspected gunman, Neil Allen MacInnis of Christiansburg, was 18 years old at the time of his arrest. Minutes prior to the attack, a message was posted on 4chan about threats of a shooting that would take place at the exact location. The message also included the name of the suspect, Neil MacInnis. MacInnis was convicted of two counts of malicious wounding and two counts of use of a firearm during the commission of a felony, and was held without bond. he was sentenced to 38 years in prison.

References

External links 
 Official website

Virginia Community College System
Educational institutions established in 1959
Universities and colleges accredited by the Southern Association of Colleges and Schools
Education in Pulaski County, Virginia
1959 establishments in Virginia